Jerson Anes Ribeiro (born 9 March 1988) is a former professional footballer who played as an attacking midfielder. Born in the Netherlands, he made one appearance for the Cape Verde national team.

Club career
Rebeiro was born in Rotterdam. He played for FC Dordrecht in the Eerste Divisie (on loan from Feyenoord), and SBV Excelsior, with whom he spent an entire Eerste Divisie season (on loan from Feyenoord) plus the first half of the club's 2010–11 Eredivisie campaign.

He joined Fortuna Sittard of Eerste Divisie on 31 January 2011. He joined FC Etar 1924 Veliko Tarnovo of Bulgaria in early 2013, where he remained until August of the same year. From Bulgaria Ribeiro continued to VV Capelle, VV Spijkenisse, and SC Feyenoord in the Netherlands and to US Mondorf-les-Bains in Luxembourg.

In 2017, Ribeiro joined the Dutch Derde Divisie-side ASWH from Hendrik-Ido-Ambacht. In 2018, he transferred to FC Maense.

International career
In February 2011, Ribeiro was called up to the Cape Verde national team for a friendly match against Burkina Faso in Óbidos, Portugal. He made his debut replacing Lito while Cape Verde won 1–0 victory.

References

External links
 
 Futbolmercado Profile
 Voetbal International Profile

1988 births
Living people
Footballers from Rotterdam
Dutch footballers
Dutch sportspeople of Cape Verdean descent
Cape Verdean footballers
Association football midfielders
Cape Verde international footballers
Eredivisie players
Eerste Divisie players
Derde Divisie players
Luxembourg National Division players
Feyenoord players
FC Dordrecht players
Excelsior Rotterdam players
Fortuna Sittard players
Almere City FC players
FC Etar 1924 Veliko Tarnovo players
VV Capelle players
VV Spijkenisse players
SC Feyenoord players
US Mondorf-les-Bains players
ASWH players
Cape Verdean expatriate footballers
Cape Verdean expatriate sportspeople in the Netherlands
Expatriate footballers in the Netherlands
Cape Verdean expatriate sportspeople in Bulgaria
Expatriate footballers in Bulgaria
Cape Verdean expatriate sportspeople in Luxembourg
Expatriate footballers in Luxembourg